Rosemary Johnson (1913–1972) was a British actress.

Ann Rosemary Johnson was born on 18 January 1913 in Balham in South West London. She was always known by her second name of Rosemary (and to many of her friends as ‘Rosie’). Her mother, Grace, was the daughter of a Presbyterian Minister, Rev John More.  Her father, John Charles Johnson, was a physician and surgeon (practising in the partnership of Ker and Johnson) and from 1912-1919 the family resided at Gothic Lodge, 1 Old Devonshire Road.

After the First World War the Johnson family moved to Southbourne in Bournemouth. They lived in Pinewood Lodge, a substantial house in Stourwood Road, a couple of minutes walk from the sea.

Rosemary Johnson attended the Royal Academy of Dramatic Art from January 1930 to December 1931.

Her professional career began in repertory theatre and she is mentioned in Full and Frank: The Private Life of a Woman Novelist by Oliver Sandys. Johnson worked mostly in repertory theatre and a little in television. 

Upon leaving RADA, she played a first season in Frinton before going on to get a job in the Aberystwyth-based repertory company run by Countess Barcynska (aka. Oliver Sandys). The company was billed as the Rogues and Vagabonds Repertory Company of West End artists in West End plays.  ‘Of course the artists were not well known West End. The younger ones had the advantage of education and some had played small parts in the Westminster Theatre, and the older ones had the advantage of experience in touring companies,’ wrote Oliver Sandys in her memoir.  ‘I was very lucky in my company,’ she goes on to say, ‘every member was as keen on the theatre as I was myself.’ Remembering fondly her trusty troupe of thespians, she included, ‘lovely twenty-year-old Rosemary Johnson, who had played at acting since she could remember. She served her apprenticeship with me brilliantly, and then went to Cardiff and Sheffield in leads.’

Life in Repertory was demanding. ‘The company travelled by motor coach, usually singing all the way and back again. A furniture van went ahead with scenery...Mondays it was Talybont (seven miles), Tuesdays, Borth (seven miles), Wednesdays, Lampeter (twenty-nine miles), Thursdays, Aberporth (thirty-three miles), Fridays, Aberdovery (twenty-eight miles), Saturdays, New Quay (twenty-three miles).  They opened at Talybont Village Hall (to an all-Welsh audience) with Rosemary Johnson playing the title role in Noel Coward’s Marquise – ‘with fine theatrical subtlety’.  Salaries ranged from £4 to £6 a week and the company got good mentions in The Western Mail and the Swansea Daily Post. They attracted enthusiastic Welsh audiences from miles around. In her memoir Oliver Sandys recalled how one young haymaker fainted in the theatre, having done a full day’s work and then cycled fifteen mile to see the Rogues and Vagabonds perform.

Two of the greatest periods of success in Rosemary Johnson’s theatrical career were with Sheffield and Northampton repertory companies. This is where she met and worked closely with the Producer, William Sherwood, which saw the beginning of a long love affair which endured the separation of the Second World War and led to their marriage in 1946. 
 
In 1936 she played in a summer season show composed of a series of vignettes: Mrs Pearce in George Bernard Shaw’s Pygmalion; Mama in a couple of scenes from Rosie’s Repentance (which she also produced); the Dancer in The Dancer and the 2nd Lion in Nippies or The Lyons’ Removers. In September she played in Duet in Floodlight by J B Priestley, which William Sherwood produced and designed sets for. In November they performed Promise by Henry Bernstein in which Rosemary Johnson played Therese. In January 1937 they put on Richard of Bordeaux by Gordon Daviot in which Rosemary Johnson played Queen Anne of Bohemia.

In March 1938 Rosemary Johnson succeeded Helen Irving at Northampton, opening with Squaring the Circle. The programmed noted, ‘Miss Johnson comes to us with a wide experience in Repertory and has lately been at Cardiff and Sheffield’. 

A notable role was as the telephone operator Hilda Rowse in the 1964 Doctor Who serial Planet of Giants.

Filmography

References

External links
 

1913 births
1972 deaths
British television actresses
20th-century British actresses